The Johann Sebastian Bach Institute (German: Johann-Sebastian-Bach-Institut) was an institute dedicated to Johann Sebastian Bach in Göttingen, Germany. It was founded in 1951 as one of two institutes preparing the New Bach Edition, the second complete edition of the composer's works.  The partner organisation was the Leipzig Bach Archive in what was then East Germany on the other side of the Iron Curtain from Göttingen. The new edition met rigorous scientific requirements and at the same time served musical practice.

The institute ended its activities in 2006 and the final volume of the New Bach Edition set appeared the following year. However, the Bach Archive Leipzig remains active and has issued revisions of some single volumes.

Directors 
 1951–1961: Hans Albrecht
 1961–1962: Wilhelm Martin Luther
 1962–1993: Georg von Dadelsen
 1993–2006: Martin Staehelin

Further reading 
 Johann-Sebastian-Bach-Institut Göttingen und Bach-Archiv Leipzig (ed), Die Neue Bach-Ausgabe 1954-2007 - Eine Dokumentation, p. 30, „Herausgebende Institute“, Kassel – Basel – London – New York – Prag 2007 (Bärenreiter)
 Georg von Dadelsen: Bachs Werke im Originaltext - Aufgaben und Erkenntnisse der Neuen Bach-Ausgabe, in: Neue Zürcher Zeitung, 16 March 1985 (printed in: Johann-Sebastian-Bach-Institut Göttingen und Bach-Archiv Leipzig (Herausgeber), Die Neue Bach-Ausgabe 1954-2007 - Eine Dokumentation, Kassel - Basel - London - New York - Prag 2007 (Bärenreiter), ps 11–16)

External links 
 Johann Sebastian Bach (1685–1750) / New Edition of the Complete Works Bärenreiter

Johann Sebastian Bach
Culture of Lower Saxony
1951 establishments in Germany
2006 disestablishments in Germany